Miro Ruiz Delgado, Jr. (born 28 January 1970) is a Peruvian politician and belongs to the  Peruvian Nationalist Party. He is a former Congressman representing Huancavelica for the period 2006–2011.  Miró Ruiz lives in the residence club Huampani's Sunflowers in the Lima district of Chaclacayo.

Biography 
He was born in Lircay on January 28, 1970. His parents were Miró Ruíz Bendezú and Rosalía Delgado Galeas. He attended his primary and secondary studies in his hometown. He completed his higher studies in accounting at the National University of the Center of Peru in the city of Huancayo, graduating in 1995. Since then he developed working in the public sector precisely in dependencies of the regional government of Huancavelica. Between 2001 and 2004 he completed a master's degree in administration and finance at the Universidad del Centre.

Political career 
In 2006 he ran for the Congress of the Republic as a candidate of the Union for Peru party for the department of Huancavelica, resulting in his election as a congressman. In the 2014 elections, he ran for the Huancavelica regional presidency under the Popular Action party, placing 8th with just over 2% of the votes.

Controversies

Killing of a dog
On May 26, 2008, Ruiz was reported to Congress by his neighbor, Nina Ventura de Cardenas, after having allegedly shot and killed her 18-month-old schnauzer, Matias. He denied the charges, claiming the dog had been harassing ducks on his property. His shooting of the dog is being reviewed by a congressional ethics committee.
On May 27, Ruiz admitted to having accidentally killed the dog "Matias" and apologized for his behavior. He also acknowledged his lie, saying that he had been pressured by the "calumnies" directed against him. However, Ruiz remains in Congress. Public apology to the country and subjected to possible sanctions by the Ethics Committee of Congress. Neither had a license to carry weapons.

External links

 Profile at Congress website
 video confession at Peruvian Congress network channel.
 the "Judicial Power"
 blog
 the newspaper El Comercio 
 http://blog.pucp.edu.pe/item/23390

Living people
1970 births
Union for Peru politicians
Peruvian Nationalist Party politicians
Members of the Congress of the Republic of Peru

People from Huancavelica Region
Popular Action (Peru) politicians